The discography of British rock band Athlete comprises four studio albums, two live albums, one compilation album, fourteen singles and three extended plays (EP). They formed in 2000 with a line-up consisting of vocalist and guitarist Joel Pott, bassist Carey Willetts, keyboardist Tim Wanstall and drummer Steve Roberts.

They released a self-titled EP in March 2002 through independent label Regal Recordings, peaking at number 85 in the UK. Its opening track, "Westside" caught the attention of major label Parlophone, who signed the band shortly afterwards. "You Got the Style" was released as the band's debut single in June 2002, followed by "Beautiful" in November 2022. Athlete released their debut studio album, Vehicles & Animals, in April 2003, peaking at number 19 on the UK Albums Chart, where it was certified platinum by the British Phonographic Industry (BPI). "Westside" was released as the album's third single a month later. "You Got the Style" was re-released in September 2003. 

"Wires" was released as the lead single from Tourist, both of which were released in January 2005. "Wires" peaked at number four in the UK, becoming their highest-charting song in that territory, and was certified silver by the BPI. The album topped the UK Albums Chart, later being certified platinum by the BPI. "Half Light" was released as its second single in April 2005, reaching number 16 in the UK. "Tourist" was released as the third single in August 2005. "Twenty Four Hours" was released as the fourth single in November 2005. "Hurricane" was released as the lead single from Beyond the Neighbourhood in August 2007, charting at number 31 in the UK. The album appeared in September 2007, reaching number five in the UK, where it was certified silver by the BPI. It was followed by its second single "Tokyo" in November 2007. The Outsiders EP was released in June 2008.

Following the recording of the fourth album, the band signed to Fiction Records, a subsidiary of Polydor Records. "Superhuman Touch" was released as a single in August 2009. Later that month, the band's fourth album Black Swan was released, reaching the UK top 20. "Black Swan Song" was released as its second single in September 2009, followed by The Getaway EP in November 2009, which peaked at number eight on the Billboard Hot Singles Sales chart. In late 2010, EMI Records released the band's first compilation album, Singles 01–10, which was promoted with the single "Back Track". The band then self-released two live albums, Live at Union Chapel and Vehicles & Animals Live, in 2012 and 2013, respectively.

Albums

Studio albums

Live albums

Compilation albums

Extended plays

Singles

Other appearances

Music videos

References
Citations

Sources

External links
 
 

Discographies of British artists
Rock music group discographies